The 394th Combat Training Squadron was a United States Air Force unit assigned to the 509th Operations Group until inactivated on 13 April 2018.  It was stationed at Whiteman Air Force Base, Missouri.   The mission of the squadron was to train Northrop Grumman B-2 Spirit aircrews, a mission now executed by the 13th Bomb Squadron.   The 394th is the fourth oldest squadron in the United States Air Force.  Its history dated to 5 May 1917 as the 4th Aero Squadron.

The 394th Combat Training Squadron provided the 509th Bomb Wing with qualified, mission-ready B-2 and Northrop T-38 Talon pilots to support worldwide Joint Chiefs of Staff taskings until its inactivation in 2018. The 394th was also responsible for implementing all B-2 and T-38 formal training courses.  The unit supervised and oversaw all T-38 operations and performed quality assurance for all maintenance and aircrew training devices, including weapon system trainers. Upon the 394th Combat Training Squadron's inactivation in 2018, its mission and responsibilities were transferred to the 13th Bomb Squadron.

History

World War I
The squadron was originally activated as the 4th Aero Squadron on 5 May 1917 during World War I at Dodd Field Texas. but within a month was transferred to Kelly Field.   The unit remained there until 24 September 1917 when it transferred to Post Field, on Fort Sill, Oklahoma. During World War I, the 4th operated as an observer training unit for the Army field artillery training school at Fort Sill. The squadron's pilots began flying the Curtiss R-4 (an Air Service racer), the Curtiss JN-4, and Curtiss JN-6(multi-purpose aircraft that were outfitted for a variety of duties).   The unit remained in Oklahoma until 2 January 1919 the unit was demobilized when all flying squadrons at Post were consolidated into the Flying School Detachment, Post Field.

Inter-War period
After World War I the second predecessor of the unit, also named the 4th Aero Squadron was activated at Hazelhurst Field, New York, on 23 June 1919 and after reorganization moved to its permanent station in Hawaii on 8 January 1920 The squadron stayed there throughout the 1920s and 1930s as part of the Hawaiian Department.

On 14 March 1921, the unit became known as the 4th Squadron (Observation). Less than two years later, on 25 January 1923, the Army Air Service renamed the unit the 4th Observations Squadron.  During this period, the squadron took to building airfields. A lieutenant and twenty enlisted persons from the 4th began construction of Wheeler Field.  Within a month, the group had completed the landing strip. The Hawaiian era also found the 4th moving several times. The squadron transferred to Schofield Barracks (6 February 1922), back to Luke Field (on Ford Island) (11 January 1927), and to Hickam Field (1 January 1939). The squadron originally reported directly to the Hawaiian Department, but was assigned to the 5th Composite Group (later, 5th Bombardment Group). During its Hawaiian days, the squadron was involved in an unusual mission. In 1926 it sowed seeds from the air for the U.S. Forestry Division.

In the late 1930s and early 1940s, the squadron received three more name changes as well as new aircraft. On 25 January 25 the Army Air Corps renamed the unit the 4th Reconnaissance Squadron. Later, on 6 December 1939, the unit
became the 4th Reconnaissance Squadron (Medium Range) and, on 20 November 1940, the organization became the 4th Reconnaissance Squadron (Heavy).  The squadron also received new aircraft to accompany its new name. In 1938,
the squadron began operating with the Douglas B-18 Bolo medium bomber.

World War II
The squadron suffered devastating casualties and equipment damage during the Japanese surprise attack on Pearl Harbor, Hickam Field and other targets on the island of Oahu on 7 December 1941. For weeks after the attack, the squadron responded by patrolling the area around Hawaii to prevent another attack. The 4th also began gearing up for combat when it received its first Boeing B-17 Flying Fortress. The unit also had several LB-30 Liberators assigned at this time and was redesignated the 394th Bombardment Squadron.

The squadron left Hawaii in November 1942 and operated in the South Pacific Theater with a mix of B-17C/D Flying Fortresses and early LB-30 aircraft.  It converted to very long-range Liberators in 1943 when the B-17s were withdrawn from combat in the Pacific and sent to Egypt for use in the Western Desert Campaign.  It served in combat during the Allied drive from the Solomons to the Philippines. The unit flew long patrol and photographic missions over the Solomon Islands and the Coral Sea, attacked Japanese shipping off Guadalcanal, and raided airfields in the northern Solomons until August 1943. It then struck enemy bases and installations on Bougainville, New Britain, and New Ireland.

The squadron raided the heavily defended Japanese base on Woleai during April and May 1944 and received a Distinguished Unit Citation for the action.  It helped to neutralize enemy bases on Yap and in the Truk and Palau Islands in June through August 1944, preparatory to the invasion of Peleliu and Leyte. The 394th flew missions to the Netherlands Indies. Completed a variety of missions from October 1944 until the end of the war, these operations including raids on enemy bases and installations on Luzon, Ceram, Halmahera, and Formosa; support for ground forces in the Philippines and Borneo; and patrols off the China coast.  Moved to Clark Field, Philippines where it was inactivated on 29 April 1946.

Modern era
For the next 41 years, the 394th waited for the chance to serve again. That opportunity arose in 1996 when the Air Force redesignated the squadron as the 394th Combat Training Squadron and turned it over to Air Combat Command for activation.  On 7 November 1996, the squadron was activated at Whiteman Air Force Base, Missouri, as part of the 509th Operations Group of the 509th Bomb Wing.

Since then, the 394th has supported the 509th in a myriad of ways including Operation Allied Force. From 23 March through 22 May 1999, the squadron sent its aircrews and aircraft almost nightly into harm’s way attempting to end the strife in the
Kosovo region.

Members of the 394th participated in Operation Enduring Freedom by flying the first of a series of long duration missions. Two B-2s, the Spirit of Georgia and the Spirit of America, departed Whiteman on 7 October 2001, bombed targets in Afghanistan, and then went on to land at a forward location following missions lasting 40.3 and 44.3 hours, respectively. Following engine running crew changes, the B-2s and crews returned to Whiteman on 9 October after sorties lasting 29 hours each for the two bombers. Total engine run time for the two B-2s was 69.3 and 73.3 hours, respectively. The sortie accomplished in the Spirit of America (73.3 hours) was the longest combat sortie in the history of the Air Force to date.

Lineage

 Organized as the 4th Aero Squadron on 5 May 1917
 Redesignated Squadron B, Post Field, OK, on 22 July 1918
 Demobilized on 2 January 1919
 Reconstituted and consolidated (1924) with the 4th Aero Squadron which was organized on 23 June 1919
 Redesignated 4th Squadron (Observation) on 14 March 1921
 Redesignated 4th Observation Squadron on 25 January 1923
 Redesignated 4th Reconnaissance Squadron on 25 January 1938
 Redesignated 4th Reconnaissance Squadron (Medium Range) on 6 December 1939
 Redesignated 4th Reconnaissance Squadron (Heavy) on 20 November 1940
 Redesignated 394th Bombardment Squadron (Heavy) on 22 April 1942
 Redesignated 394th Bombardment Squadron, Heavy by September 1944
 Inactivated on 29 April 1946
 Redesignated 394th Combat Training Squadron on 22 October 1996
 Activated on 6 November 1996
 Inactivated c. 13 April 2018

Assignments
 Eastern Department, 23 June 1919
 2d Observation Group, 15 December 1919 (attached to the Eastern Department until 8 January 1920)
 Hawaiian Department, 31 January 1922 (Divisional aviation for the Hawaiian Division, February 1922 – January 1927)
 5th Composite Group (later 5th Bombardment) Group, assigned 11 January 1927, attached 12 October 1938, assigned 25 February 1942 – 29 April 1946
 509th Operations Group, 6 November 1996 – c. 13 April 2018

Stations

 Dodd Field, Fort Sam Houston, Texas, 5 May 1917
 Kelly Field, Texas, May 1917
 Fort Sill, Oklahoma, 24 September 1917
 Post Field, Oklahoma, November 1917 – 2 January 1919
 Hazelhurst Field, New York, 23 June 1919
 Mitchel Field, New York, November 1919 – 8 January 1920
 Luke Field, Hawaii Territory, 24 January 1920
 Schofield Barracks, Hawaii Territory, 6 February 1922
 Luke Field, Hawaii Territory, 11 January 1927
 Hickam Field, Hawaii Territory, 1 January 1939
 Bellows Field, Hawaii Territory, c.30 May 1942
 Hickam Field, Hawaii Territory, 24 July 1942
 Bellows Field, Hawaii Territory, 28 September-17 November 1942

 Nadi Airfield, Viti Levu, Fiji Islands, 25 December 1942
 Operated from Palikulo Bay Airfield, Espiritu Santo, New Hebrides and Henderson Field, Guadalcanal, Solomon Islands, 3–19 January 1943, and 25 April – 5 June 1943
 Henderson Field, Guadalcanal, Solomon Islands, c. 28 June 1943
 Operated from Munda Airfield, New Georgia, Solomon Islands, c.28 February – 9 April 1944
 Momote Airfield, Los Negros, Admiralty Islands, 13 April 1944
 Wakde Airfield, Netherlands East Indies, c.25 August 1944
 Kornasoren (Yebrurro) Airfield, Noemfoor, Schouten Islands, c.27 September 1944
 Wama Airfield, Morotai, Netherlands East Indies, 1 November 1944
 Guiuan Airfield, Samar, Philippines, c.2 March 1945
 Clark Field, Luzon, Philippines, December 1945 – 29 April 1946
 Whiteman Air Force Base, Missouri, 6 November 1996 – c. 13 April 2018

Aircraft
 Apparently included Curtiss Model R-4, Curtiss JN-4, and JN-6, during period 1917–1919
 Primarily Airco DH.4 during period 1919–1929; in addition to Thomas-Morse O-19 and Thomas-Morse OA-1, included Martin B-12 bomber and Boeing P-12 fighter during period 1929–1937
 Primarily B-18 Bolo during period 1938–1941
 Boeing B-17 Flying Fortress, 1941–1942; November 1942 – 1943
 Consolidated LB-30 Liberator, 1942
 Consolidated B-24 Liberator, 1943–1945
 Northrop T-38 Talon, 1996–2018
 B-2 Spirit, 1996–2018

See also

 Gene Roddenberry
 List of American aero squadrons
 List of United States Air Force training squadrons

References

Notes

Bibliography

External links
 http://www.patriotfiles.com/index.php?name=Sections&req=viewarticle&artid=1968&page=1

0394